Jean du Tillet may refer to either of two brothers:

Jean du Tillet, sieur de La Bussière (died 2 October 1570), archivist and historian
Jean du Tillet (bishop) (died 18 December 1570), antiquarian